Aljufri Daud (born May 1, 2000) is an Indonesian professional footballer who plays as a full-back.

Club career

Borneo
He made his professional debut in the Liga 1 on 18 September 2019, against Madura United where he played as a substitute.

Career statistics

Club

Notes

References

External links
 Aljufri Daud at Liga Indonesia
 Aljufri Daud at Soccerway

2000 births
Living people
Indonesian footballers
Borneo F.C. players
Association football defenders
People from Ternate
Sportspeople from North Maluku